Suillellus comptus is a species of bolete fungus found in Europe. Originally described as a species of Boletus in 1993, it was transferred to Suillellus in 2014.

References

External links

comptus
Fungi described in 1993
Fungi of Europe